Çanaqbulaq (also, Chanakhbulag and Chanakhbulak) is a village in the Qabala Rayon of Azerbaijan.

References 

Populated places in Qabala District